Garret Andrew Siler (born October 25, 1986)  is an American professional basketball player for Marinos de Anzoátegui of the Venezuelan Liga Profesional de Baloncesto (LPB). He formerly played center for Augusta State University (now Augusta University). When he went undrafted in the 2009 NBA Draft, he first signed with the D-League's Utah Flash and then the Chinese Basketball Association's Shanghai Sharks. During his one year with the Sharks, he averaged 14.3 points and 9.3 rebounds per game on 74 percent shooting from the field.

During the summer of 2010, he played for the New Jersey Nets in the Orlando portion of the NBA Summer League and for the Miami Heat in the Las Vegas portion. For Miami, he averaged 6.6 points, 3.8 rebounds, and 0.6 blocks while playing for 14 minutes per game for five games and shooting 75 percent from the field. On September 20, Siler was invited to practice for the Phoenix Suns. One day later, the Suns decided to give him a two-year contract for the NBA's minimum salary. On January 2, 2011, the Phoenix Suns assigned Garret to the Iowa Energy for 10 games. He was later called back up to Phoenix. The Suns implemented a weight clause for Siler. On January 2, 2012, after a win against the Golden State Warriors, the Suns announced that they waived Garret Siler. Siler was the first player from Augusta University (Georgia) to ever play for an NBA team. He also has the distinction of being the only John S. Davidson Fine Arts Magnet School student to play for a major professional sports team.

In 2012, he was named to the Washington Wizards's 2012 NBA Summer League team. He then played for the Jiangsu Dragons in the CBA. In 2013, he joined the Leones de Ponce in Puerto Rico. He was waived midseason.

After taking a year off, Siler would end up playing for the Pure-Youth Construction Basketball Team in Taiwan sometime in 2015. During this time, Siler would end up helping the team get their fourth straight championship, as well as earn Championship Series MVP honors during the final matches of the season.

On May 16, he signed with Marinos de Anzoátegui of the Venezuelan Liga Profesional de Baloncesto.

NCAA career statistics 

|-
| align="left" | 2005–06
| align="left" | Augusta State
| 21 || 7 || 9.2 || .699 || .000 || .409 || 2.4 || 0.19 || 0.05 || 0.57 || 5.3
|-
| align="left" | 2006–07
| align="left" | Augusta State
| 31 || 31 || 22.6 || .689 || .000 || .603 || 6.8 || 0.77 || 0.45 || 2.39 || 13.1
|-
| align="left" | 2007–08
| align="left" | Augusta State
| 34 || 33 || 26.6 || .762 || .000 || .579 || 7.8 || 1.18 || 0.35 || 2.62 || 15.2
|-
| align="left" | 2008–09
| align="left" | Augusta State
| 35 || 35 || 26.8 || .789 || .000 || .655 || 7.7 || 0.86 || 0.37 || 2.57 || 16.2
|-
| align="left" | 
| align="left" | Career
| 121 || 106 || 21.3 || .735 || .000 || .562 || 6.2 || 0.75 || 0.31 || 2.04 || 12.5

International career statistics

Chinese Basketball Association

NBA career statistics

|-
| align="left" | 
| align="left" | Phoenix
| 21 || 0 || 4.8 || .548 || .000 || .500 || 1.3 || .1 || .0 || .2 || 2.1
|-
| align="left" | 
| align="left" | Career
| 21 || 0 || 4.8 || .548 || .000 || .500 || 1.3 || .1 || .0 || .2 || 2.1

D-League career statistics

|-
| align="left" | 2010–11
| aligh="left" | Iowa Energy
| 4 || 1 || 16.3 || .583 || .000 || .500 || 5.0 || .3 || .0 || .8 || 4.5
|-
| align="left" | 
| align="left" | Career
| 4 || 1 || 16.3 || .583 || .000 || .500 || 5.0 || .3 || .0 || .8 || 4.5

References

External links
7-foot Siler Invited To Suns Training Camp
NBA Draft profile
Garret Siler's website

1986 births
Living people
American expatriate basketball people in China
American expatriate basketball people in Taiwan
American expatriate basketball people in Venezuela
American men's basketball players
Augusta Jaguars men's basketball players
Basketball players from Augusta, Georgia
Centers (basketball)
Iowa Energy players
Jiangsu Dragons players
Leones de Ponce basketball players
Phoenix Suns players
Shanghai Sharks players
Undrafted National Basketball Association players
Fubon Braves players
Yulon Luxgen Dinos players
Pauian Archiland basketball players
Kinmen Kaoliang Liquor basketball players
Super Basketball League imports